Clough is a village and townland in County Down, Northern Ireland. It sits about 3 miles from Dundrum on the A2 between Newcastle and Belfast. The A2 continues via Downpatrick and the coast via Strangford and the Portaferry - Strangford Ferry to Portaferry to Belfast, whilst most road traffic heads along from Clough along the A24 via Carryduff to Belfast. It had a population of 255 people in the 2001 Census. Clough is situated within the Newry, Mourne and Down area.

Places of interest

Clough Castle, an excellent example of an Anglo-Norman motte-and-bailey castle with stone tower.

Etymology
A map of 1634 marked the village as Machaeracate and the castle is  "Stone castle of the plain of the cat". This comes from a local legend of the chase of magic cat.

References

External links
NI Neighbourhood Information Service
Culture Northern Ireland

Villages in County Down
Townlands of County Down
Civil parish of Loughinisland